Mahesh Basnet may refer to

 Mahesh Basnet (Nepalese politician, born 1975), former member of parliament for Bhaktapur 2 and Minister for Industry
 Mahesh Basnet (Nepalese politician, born 1960), incumbent member of parliament for Ilam 1